Holland Christian High School is a private, Calvinist high school in the city of Holland, Michigan. Holland Christian's colors are maroon and white, and their nickname is "The Maroons". Holland Christian High School is the only grade 9–12 building in the Holland Christian Schools system.

History
By 1963 the school had 264 students in the tenth grade, 289 in the 12th grade, and other grades ranging 173-200 students. Prior to 1965 Zeeland Christian School only had up to junior high school and referred high school students to Holland Christian High. The Zeeland Christian School high school was scheduled to open in 1965 but never happened.

Campus
In 1963 the library used blond wood furniture and included decorations.

Athletics
The school uses Holland Civic Center for its basketball matches. The Holland Evening Sentinel, in 1963, stated that the school's athletic facilities were inadequate.

The men's varsity soccer team, coached by Dave DeBoer, won the 2022 division three Michigan state championship. Holland Christian won two other soccer state championships in 1986 and 2003.

Notable alumni
Kathy Arendsen, softball player and coach
Jeff Bates, co-founder of Slashdot
Kirk Cousins, quarterback for the Minnesota Vikings and former starting quarterback at Michigan State University
Klaas de Boer, retired U.S. soccer player and coach.
Betsy DeVos, former United States Secretary of Education and former chair of the Republican party in Michigan
Anthony Diekema, former president of Calvin College
William Garvelink, U.S. Ambassador to the Democratic Republic of Congo Ambassadors from the United States
Tony Gugino, American professional basketball player
Dave Hertel, American retired soccer player.
Pete Hoekstra, Former U.S. Congressman from Michigan's 2 District, U.S. House of Representatives and former U.S. Ambassador to the Netherlands
Bill Huizenga, Republican U.S. Representative of Michigan's 2nd congressional district.
David Kool, collegiate basketball player
Paul Ronald Lambers, Medal of Honor Recipient – Vietnam War
Rob Malda, computer programmer; co-founder of Slashdot
Erik Prince, business executive; founder and sole owner of Blackwater USA and the Prince Group
Rachel Reenstra, host of Ms. Adventure on the Animal Planet network

References

External links 

 

Private high schools in Michigan
Christian schools in Michigan
Educational institutions established in 1902
Schools in Ottawa County, Michigan
1902 establishments in Michigan